Ticonderoga is a hamlet in the southeast part of the town of Ticonderoga, in Essex County, New York, United States. The name is derived from the Haudenosaunee term for "between the two waters", the two waters being Lake George and Lake Champlain. The hamlet became a census-designated place (CDP) in 2008. As of the 2010 census, the population was 3,382, out of a total 5,042 residents in the town of Ticonderoga.

History
In 1889, the hamlet of Ticonderoga was incorporated as a village within the town of Ticonderoga, but in 1992 residents voted to dissolve the village. The area is an important location for the production of paper and the mining of graphite; the familiar yellow "Ticonderoga pencils" were named after the graphite mines.

Fort Ticonderoga, near the hamlet on Lake Champlain, (the hamlet is on Lake George), was a military outpost that fell into disrepair. The modern fort was built on its ruins.

The 1988 publication, "Ticonderoga (Village) Multiple Resource Area", presents a history of the village and its historic sites.

The Lake George Steamboat Company continues to operate steamboats from Ticonderoga.

Geography
Ticonderoga is in Upstate New York, south of Plattsburgh, and near the Vermont border.  
The community lies between Lake George and Lake Champlain on the site of a portage between the two lakes, previously guarded by historic Fort Ticonderoga. The waterway running through this portage is called the La Chute River, which drains the outflow of Lake George into Lake Champlain, and it contains a waterfall at the eastern edge of the hamlet.

During the summer, a diesel-powered cable ferry connects the community to Shoreham, Vermont.

The junction of New York State Route 9N, New York State Route 74, and New York State Route 22 is at the northern edge of the CDP.

Demographics

See also
National Register of Historic Places listings in Essex County, New York

References

External links
 Ticonderoga area chamber of commerce 
 Fort Ticonderoga 
 Ticonderoga ferry information 
 History and picture of the area  
 Raster map of Ticonderoga and village boundaries in 1950

Hamlets in New York (state)
Former villages in New York (state)
Census-designated places in New York (state)
Census-designated places in Essex County, New York
Hamlets in Essex County, New York
Populated places disestablished in 1993